Harkcom Creek is a stream in the U.S. state of Minnesota.

Harkcom Creek was named for an early settler.

See also
List of rivers of Minnesota

References

Rivers of Dodge County, Minnesota
Rivers of Olmsted County, Minnesota
Rivers of Minnesota